Twins is a 1925 American silent comedy film featuring Stan Laurel.

Cast
 Stan Laurel as Stan/his twin
 Julie Leonard as Stan's girl
 Alberta Vaughn as The wife

See also
 List of American films of 1925

External links

1925 films
American silent short films
American black-and-white films
1925 comedy films
1925 short films
Films directed by Joe Rock
Films directed by Scott Pembroke
Silent American comedy films
American comedy short films
Twins in fiction
1920s American films